Oscar Jacques (born Peterborough, England) is an English actor best known for playing Tom Tupper in the CBBC M.I. High. Jacques was formerly a member of Perth Youth Theatre in Scotland. He is a writer director with Edinburgh based production company The Odd Complex with co-founder, writer and composer Eliot Rhys. Jacques is also a stand-up comedian.

Filmography

Television

References

External links

Living people
British male television actors
21st-century British male actors
British people of French descent
People from Peterborough
Year of birth missing (living people)